Central Jersey is the central region of the U.S. state of New Jersey. The designation of Central New Jersey is a distinct administrative toponym.

Geographic area and descriptions

While the State of New Jersey is often divided into North and South Jersey some residents, including the governor recognize Central Jersey as a distinct entity.

All descriptions of Central Jersey include Middlesex County, the center of population of New Jersey, and tend to include much of nearby Monmouth, Mercer, Somerset, and Hunterdon counties. The inclusion of adjacent areas of Union, and Ocean counties is subjective and a source of debate. In 2015, New Jersey Business magazine, a publication of the New Jersey Business & Industry Association, defined Central Jersey more narrowly as the five counties of Hunterdon, Mercer, Middlesex, Monmouth and Somerset. 

In 2022, legislation was proposed in the New Jersey Legislature to establish distinct geographic categories for tourism in the state of New Jersey. Bill A4711 is sponsored by Assemblymembers Roy Freiman, Sadaf Jaffer, and Anthony Verrelli in the New Jersey General Assembly (the lower house in the New Jersey Legislature). This would include an official designation of the region of Central Jersey, in which this legislation defines more broadly as the seven counties of Hunterdon, Mercer, Middlesex, Monmouth, Ocean, Somerset, and Union Counties. The four bills within this legislation went into a joint meeting of the Assembly Agriculture and Food Security Committee and the Assembly Tourism, Gaming and the Arts Committee. As of February 17, 2023, the bills have been cleared by these committees and will now advance to a vote in the General Assembly. The New Jersey Senate version of this legislation has yet to have advanced to a vote.

The intersection of the two busiest highways in New Jersey, namely the New Jersey Turnpike and the Garden State Parkway, is located in Woodbridge, Middlesex County.

Trenton, the seat of Mercer County, is the state capital of New Jersey. New Jersey's geographic center is located in Hamilton Township, Mercer County. In 2011, the population center of the state was alongside Nenninger Lane in the western portion of East Brunswick, which is also known as the "Heart of Middlesex County". There are other related, overlapping areas that include counties in the midsection of the state.

The region lies roughly at the geographic heart of the Northeast Megalopolis. It is wholly within the New York metropolitan area and elements are sometimes defined as parts of smaller metropolitan statistical areas of New Jersey.

The Delaware Valley is another area that is associated with some parts of Central Jersey, specifically Mercer County. Yet despite the County’s close geographic proximity to Philadelphia's combined statistical area, Mercer County is considered part of the New York Combined Metropolitan Statistical Area as defined by the United States Census Bureau. Some parts of Hunterdon County associate themselves with the Delaware Valley and the Philadelphia Area, although Hunterdon County isn't geographically defined in this area.

The New Jersey Department of Tourism places Middlesex and Union in the Gateway Region and Mercer in the Delaware Valley. Monmouth and Ocean counties are considered part of the Jersey Shore, while Somerset and Hunterdon counties are part of Skylands Region.

The Raritan Valley is the region along the middle reaches of the Raritan River and its North Branch and South Branch. The Raritan Valley includes the communities of Branchburg, Bridgewater, Somerville, Raritan, Hillsborough, Franklin, Green Brook, North Plainfield, Bound Brook, and South Bound Brook, all in Somerset County; Dunellen, Middlesex, Piscataway, South Plainfield, Highland Park, New Brunswick, East Brunswick, Edison, and Metuchen, all in the northern and central portions of Middlesex County; and Plainfield in southwestern Union County.

The Raritan Bayshore is used to describe the region in Middlesex and Monmouth Counties, located along the coastline of the Raritan Bay, from the mouth of the Raritan River in the west to the barrier island of Sandy Hook bordering the Atlantic Ocean in the east. The Raritan Bayshore includes the communities of Sayreville, Woodbridge, Perth Amboy, South Amboy, and Old Bridge, all in northeastern Middlesex County; Aberdeen, Matawan, Keyport, Union Beach, Hazlet, Keansburg, Holmdel, Middletown, Atlantic Highlands, and Highlands, all in northern Monmouth County.

The telephone area codes 732 and 848 includes Middlesex, Monmouth, Somerset, Union, and northern Ocean counties.

At least two counties in Central Jersey carry official nicknames: Mercer County is known as "The Capital County" and Middlesex County carries the nickname "The Greatest County in the Land".

Colonial era

Between 1674 and 1702, in the early part of New Jersey's colonial period, the border between West Jersey and East Jersey ran diagonally across the middle part of the state. The Keith Line, as the demarcation is known, ran through the center of what is now Mercer County. This border remained important in determining ownership and political boundaries until 1745. Remnants of that division are seen today, notably as the Hunterdon-Somerset, Ocean-Burlington, and Monmouth-Burlington county lines. The division of the two provinces was cultural as well as geographical.

New Jersey's position between the major cities of New York and Philadelphia led Benjamin Franklin to call the state "a barrel tapped at both ends". Travel between the two cities originally included a ferry crossing. Due to the obstacles created by the Meadowlands and the Hudson Palisades, passengers from New York would cross the North River (Hudson River) and the Upper New York Bay by boat and then transfer to stagecoaches to travel overland through what is now Central Jersey. One route from Elizabethtown to Lambertville was known as Old York Road. Another route, from Perth Amboy through Kingston to Burlington, ran along a portion of the Kings Highway, These roads followed Lenape paths known respectively as the Naritcong Trail and the Assunpink Trail.

Raritan Landing, across from New Brunswick in today's Piscataway, became an important inland port and commercial hub for the region. Two of the nine Colonial Colleges, founded before the American Revolution, were the College of New Jersey (now Princeton University), and Queens College (now Rutgers University).

Population

Economy

All of the region's counties are ranked among the highest income counties in the United States, as measured by median household income. It has been called the state's "wealth belt".

Manufacturing
For decades, Central Jersey was a hub for manufacturing in the eastern United States. Many industrial companies had major production facilities in and around the area, including Edison Assembly, Ford Motor Company's production plant for Rangers, Mustangs, Pintos, Mercurys, and Lincolns. Other notable companies include General Motors in Linden, Frigidaire's air-conditioner plant in Edison, Hess Corporation in Woodbridge, Siemens in Edison, and ExxonMobil Chemical.

Starting in the 2000s, manufacturing began to leave Central Jersey, and many facilities had closed and moved overseas.

Telecommunications and high technology
The Bell Labs Holmdel Complex has been the site of many innovations in telecommunications and is experiencing a renaissance as a business incubator for high-tech startup companies. Today Verizon Wireless, AT&T Communications, Vonage, Avaya, and Bell Labs are located in the region.

Healthcare and pharmaceuticals

New Brunswick is known as "the Healthcare City", due to the concentration of medical facilities in Central Jersey, including Robert Wood Johnson University Hospital and Saint Peter's University Hospital, as well as the University of Medicine and Dentistry of New Jersey (UMDNJ)-Robert Wood Johnson Medical School. University Medical Center of Princeton is located in Plainsboro. The campuses of the major pharmaceutical corporations Bristol-Myers Squibb Company, Johnson & Johnson, Merck and Sanofi-Aventis are located in the region, as are major operations of Dr. Reddy's Laboratories and Aurobindo Pharma. Princeton University's Frist Campus Center is used for the aerial views of Princeton‑Plainsboro Teaching Hospital seen in the television series House.

Shopping malls

Major shopping centers include the Freehold Raceway Mall, Woodbridge Center, Menlo Park Mall, Bridgewater Commons, The Grove at Shrewsbury, Monmouth Mall, Brunswick Square Mall, Forrestal Village, Quaker Bridge Mall, Princeton Market Fair, Ocean County Mall, Jackson Premium Outlets, and Jersey Shore Premium Outlets.

Academia
Rutgers-New Brunswick, Monmouth University, Princeton University, Princeton Theological Seminary, Rider University, New Brunswick Theological Seminary, and The College of New Jersey are located in Central Jersey. Each county maintains its own county college, with the exception of Hunterdon County - whose residents may attend either Raritan Valley Community College (located in Somerset County) or Mercer County Community College (located in Mercer County) at no additional cost. Monmouth County's residents have the choice of attending Brookdale Community College which was recently listed as one of the top three community colleges in the state. Thomas Edison State College in Trenton provides extensive on-line and adult education. Kean University is in Union County.

Tourism and cultural attractions

Popular tourist attractions in Central New Jersey include Six Flags Great Adventure, Gateway National Recreation Area, Monmouth Park Racetrack, Freehold Raceway, and the many boardwalks along the northern Jersey Shore, in Monmouth County and northern Ocean County.

The New Brunswick music scene has produced many successful indie bands. The city also is home to the New Jersey Folk Festival. In an early era, the Stone Pony  and Asbury Park Convention Hall were important venues on the rock scene. Major music and theater venues in the region include PNC Bank Arts Center, the Trenton War Memorial, CURE Insurance Arena, the McCarter Theater, the Count Basie Theater, the George Street Playhouse and the Starland Ballroom.

East Jersey Olde Towne Village, the Road Up Raritan Historic District as well as those in Trenton, Lawrence, and Princeton recall the colonial era. The region saw a lot of action during the American Revolution due to the region's strategic importance between Philadelphia and New York City. As such, many important battles took place here. These battle sites have been converted into state parks, offering historic preservation of the important structures contingent to their respected battles. State parks include Washington Crossing State Park, Princeton Battlefield State Park, and Monmouth Battlefield State Park. Ocean Grove is one of the largest national historic sites in the United States.

Media markets and national sports
Depending on the location, different parts of Central Jersey fall into overlapping spheres of influence from New York media market and Philadelphia media market. Portions of Mercer, Monmouth, Ocean, and Middlesex counties are located within both the New York City and the Philadelphia television markets, while the rest of the region belongs wholly to the New York market.

While The Star-Ledger has the largest circulation of all newspapers in New Jersey, four Central Jersey newspapers, Asbury Park Press, Home News Tribune, and two Trenton dailies, The Trentonian and The Times and several local papers are published in Central Jersey. New Jersey On-Line, CentralJersey.com and MyCentralJersey.com are web based news services.  During statewide political events like Gubernatorial or Senatorial election debates often held in Trenton, partner stations from both the New York and Philadelphia markets pool resources together to co-host the events and bring them to New Jersey homes.

Identification with sports teams is also affected by the region's location, and it is not uncommon to find fans of major sports teams of either city. For example, while residents of northern New Jersey root for New York teams, those in the southern part of the state root for Philadelphia teams. The distinction is less clear in Central Jersey. Central Jersey Riptide was a short-lived professional soccer club.

Transportation

The New Jersey Department of Transportation (NJDOT) operates three divisions in the state: North, South, and Central, which encompasses Hunterdon, Mercer, Middlesex, Monmouth, Ocean, and Somerset counties and portions of Warren County. (Routes 22, 122, 173, 78 and including south of Route 57). Apart from Mercer County, which comes under the auspices of the Delaware Valley Regional Planning Commission, all counties in the region are part of the North Jersey Transportation Planning Authority, a government partner which approves transportation projects for the state.

The United New Jersey Railroad and Canal Company traversed the region in 1830, eventually becoming the Pennsylvania Railroad (PRR). NJT's Northeast Corridor Line and the North Jersey Coast were once part of the PRR, as was Amtrak which serves the commuter hub at Metropark, New Brunswick, and the Trenton Transit Center. The Central Railroad of New Jersey once connected Jersey City (with connecting ferries to Manhattan) and many Central Jersey towns. Much of that system is now included in New Jersey Transit rail operations to the Raritan Valley. New Brunswick is known as the Hub City, and at one time was a regional transportation hub for streetcars which converged in the city. The Monmouth Ocean Middlesex Line has been proposed for the region.

The Garden State Parkway, New Jersey Turnpike (Interstate 95), Interstate 287, U.S. Route 1, U.S. Route 9, New Jersey Route 18, and New Jersey Route 35 are major automobile routes through Central Jersey that pass over the Raritan River at Perth Amboy and New Brunswick. Interstate 195 travels through Central Jersey (hence the name "Central Jersey Expressway") from the Trenton area towards Belmar.

From the Raritan Bayshore, SeaStreak catamarans travel to Pier 11 at Wall Street and East 34th Street Ferry Landing. NY Waterway ferries travel to Paulus Hook Ferry Terminal in Jersey City, Battery Park City Ferry Terminal, and West Midtown Ferry Terminal. As of 2018, there are plans to create ferry service from Carteret in Middlesex County.

Trenton-Mercer Airport is the only airport in Central New Jersey providing long-distance commercial service. Monmouth Executive Airport, formerly known as Allaire Airport, is a public-use airport located near Allaire State Park. Central Jersey Regional Airport is a privately owned, public airport in Somerset County. Linden Airport is a small general aviation airport located along U.S. Route 1&9 in Union County.

The Route 9 BBS, the New Brunswick BRT, and the Central Jersey Route 1 Corridor are projects in the region intended to expand the use of bus rapid transit in New Jersey.

Asian American population

Asian Indian population

Central New Jersey, particularly Edison and surrounding Middlesex County, is prominently known for its significant concentration of Asian Indians. The world's largest Hindu temple was inaugurated in Robbinsville in 2014, a BAPS temple. The growing Little India is a South Asian-focused commercial strip in Middlesex County, the U.S. county with the highest concentration of Asian Indians, at nearly 20% as of 2020. The Oak Tree Road strip runs for about one-and-a-half miles through Edison and neighboring Iselin in Woodbridge Township, near the area's sprawling Chinatown and Koreatown, running along New Jersey Route 27. It is the largest and most diverse South Asian cultural hub in the United States. Monroe Township (nicknamed Edison South), in Middlesex County, has experienced a particularly rapid growth rate in its Indian American population, with an estimated 5,943 (13.6%) as of 2017, which was 23 times the 256 (0.9%) counted as of the 2000 Census; and Diwali is celebrated by the township as a Hindu holiday. Carteret's Punjabi Sikh community, variously estimated at upwards of 3,000, constitutes the largest concentration of Sikhs in the state. In Middlesex County, election ballots are printed in English, Spanish, Gujarati, Hindi, and Punjabi.

Indian pharmaceutical and technology companies are coming to Central New Jersey to gain a foothold in the United States. Dr. Reddy's Laboratories, based in Hyderabad, set up its U.S. headquarters in Princeton, Mercer County. Pharmaceutical company Aurobindo, also headquartered in Hyderabad, has established its U.S. headquarters in the Dayton section of South Brunswick, Middlesex County, and has implemented a multimillion-dollar expansion of these Central New Jersey operations. In March 2023, Bengaluru-based technology services and consulting company Wipro opened its American international headquarters in East Brunswick, Middlesex, County.

Taiwanese population

Starting in the 2000s, highly educated suburbs in northern and central New Jersey, have received a large influx of Taiwanese immigrants. Many Taiwanese American families send their children to Mandarin language schools in Edison. Some of these private schools include Edison Chinese School, located at John Adams Middle School, or Tzu Chi, located at Woodrow Wilson Middle School, both of which teach in Traditional Chinese. The Taiwanese airline China Airlines provides private bus service to John F. Kennedy International Airport from the Kam Man Food location in Edison to feed its flight to Taipei, Taiwan.

See also
 North Jersey
 South Jersey

References

External links

 
New Jersey culture
Regions of New Jersey